David John Brightwell (born 7 January 1971) is an English former professional footballer who played as defender from 1988 to 2002.

He notably played Premier League football for Manchester City and went on to play in the Football League for Chester City, Lincoln City, Stoke City, Bradford City, Blackpool, Northampton Town, Carlisle United, Hull City and Darlington.

Playing career
Brightwell played for ten professional clubs during his long career. He started at Manchester City, where he had been a trainee. He played 44 league games but also had loans spell at Chester City, Lincoln City, Stoke City and Bradford City.

He joined Bradford permanently in December 1995 for £30,000 and took part in their 1995–96 promotion season. He spent a period on loan at Blackpool before he signed on a free transfer for Northampton Town. He made further free transfers to Carlisle United and Hull City before signing for his final club Darlington in February 2001. Whilst at Carlisle, he played a part in one of the most dramatic footballing moments of all time. With Carlisle needing to beat Plymouth Argyle on the last day of the season to avoid relegation from the Football League, Brightwell equalised from 25 yards when they fell behind and this paved the way for Jimmy Glass, their goalkeeper, to score the winner in injury time.

Brightwell played a total of 258 league games during his career, scoring eight goals.

Personal life
Brightwell was born in Lutterworth, England. He is the son of Olympic gold medalist Ann Packer and 400m runner Robbie Brightwell and brother of footballer Ian Brightwell. He now works as a fireman.

Career statistics
Source:

A.  The "Other" column constitutes appearances and goals in the Anglo-Italian Cup, Football League Trophy.

Honours

As a player
Manchester City
Second Division runner-up: 1988–89

References

External links
 

1971 births
Living people
People from Lutterworth
Footballers from Leicestershire
English footballers
Association football defenders
Manchester City F.C. players
Chester City F.C. players
Lincoln City F.C. players
Stoke City F.C. players
Bradford City A.F.C. players
Blackpool F.C. players
Northampton Town F.C. players
Carlisle United F.C. players
Hull City A.F.C. players
Darlington F.C. players
Premier League players
English Football League players